Emilio "El Indio" Fernández Romo (26 March 1904 – 6 October 1986) was a Mexican film director, actor and screenwriter. He was one of the most prolific film directors of the Golden Age of Mexican cinema in the 1940s and 1950s. He is best known for his work as director of the film María Candelaria (1944), which won the Palme d'Or award at the 1946 Cannes Film Festival. As an actor, he worked in numerous film productions in Mexico and in Hollywood.

Early life
Born in Sabinas, Coahuila, on 26 March 1904, Emilio Fernández Romo was the son of a revolutionary general, while his mother was a descendant of Kickapoo Indians. He was the father of the Mexican actor Jaime Fernández. From his parents he inherited a deep feeling and love for his country, as well as its customs and indigenous beliefs, that led him to build his personality as a man of impetuous character. From his earliest years and throughout his life, he was characterized by a strong personality, brash character and pride in his indigenous roots, traits forged by the great influence exercised on him by his family.

When he was a teenager, a fatal event forced him to flee his home and enlist in the ranks of the Mexican Revolution. Later, he entered the Mexican Military Academy (where in 1954 he gained the rank of colonel). In 1923 he took part in the uprising of Adolfo de la Huerta against the government of Álvaro Obregón, but this insurrection failed and he was sent to prison. He escaped, and left Mexico to go into exile, first in Chicago and later in Los Angeles. There he earned his living as a laundry employee, bartender, longshoreman, press assistant, and finally as a stonemason for Hollywood studio construction, a circumstance that favored his foray into film as an extra and as a double for stars like Douglas Fairbanks.

Model for the Oscar statuette
Fernández is rumored to be the model for the Oscar statuette, but not confirmed. The legend suggested that MGM art director Cedric Gibbons, one of the original Motion Picture Academy members tasked with creating the Academy Award trophy, was introduced to Fernández by actress Dolores del Río and persuaded him to pose nude.

His appearance in the film industry, though casual at first, became a commitment, encouraged by the same De la Huerta, who told him: Mexico does not want or need more revolutions Emilio. You are in the Mecca of film, and film is the most effective tool we humans have invented to express ourselves. Learn to make movies and you return to our homeland with that knowledge. Make our films so you can express your ideas so they reach thousands of people.
In 1930 he had an experience that significantly marked his career as a creator: his stay in the United States coincided with the arrival in the country of Sergei Eisenstein (Soviet film director). He went to private screenings of Eisenstein's films, which impressed him, revealing a style that was different from that used in Hollywood aesthetics.  Three years later, he was influenced by seeing fragments of  Que viva Mexico! (an Eisenstein film made in that country), which consolidated his desire to make films.

He returned to Mexico in 1933, thanks to an amnesty granted by the government, with the decision to continue his film career, but during the first year he made a living as a boxer, a diver in Acapulco, a baker and an aviator. In 1934,  he appeared as a bandolero (robber) in the film Cruz Diablo, directed by Fernando de Fuentes. His looks also landed him a starring role playing a native in Janitzio by Carlos Navarro. This was when Fernández's film career took off.

"El Indio" continued to keep busy in Mexico, performing melodramas and folklore films. In 1941, with the financial support of General Juan Francisco Azcárate and the encouragement of his friend, the actor David Silva (then a law student), he filmed La isla de la pasión with which he made his debut as a director. That same year he traveled to Cuba where he met the woman who would be his first wife, Gladys Fernández, and he adopted her daughter Adela.

In 1943 he was contacted by the Mexican film Studios Films Mundiales. Emilio Fernández (director), Mauricio Magdaleno (writer), Gabriel Figueroa (photographer), Dolores del Río and Pedro Armendáriz (actors) formed the team that achieved the biggest blockbusters of the time. Their first work together was Flor silvestre, the film that debuted Dolores del Río in the Mexican cinema.

Next, Fernández filmed the popular María Candelaria (1944), for which he was awarded the Palm d'Or at Cannes along with Gabriel Figueroa. He developed his own style which had such an effect in the industry that his portrayal of rural Mexico became a standard for the film industry, and also became the image of Mexico in the world.

In 1945, based on the history of American writer John Steinbeck (who adapted the screenplay in collaboration with him), Fernández filmed La perla, one of the most important films in his long filmography, considered by critics as a work of art which portrays a story of ignorance and human misery, achieved by the photography of Figueroa and direction of Fernández. It is an allegory about the limits of wickedness of man in his greed and desire for power. This film won the award for Best Cinematography, and a mention for Best Film contribution to progress in the Venice Film Festival (1947). It also received the Silver Ariel (1948) for Best Picture, Directing, Male Performance and Photography; the award of the Hollywood Foreign Press Association (1949), and the award for Best Cinematography at the Festival of Madrid (1949).

By that time his career was at the pinnacle of success. He went onto direct Enamorada with María Félix; The Fugitive ; Río Escondido (winner of Best Cinematography in the Karlovy Vary in Czechoslovakia); Pueblerina with his then wife Columba Domínguez and Maclovia. In 1949, Salon Mexico won the award for Best Cinematography at the festival in Brussels, Belgium.  He followed these in 1950 with urban films, Víctimas del Pecado, starring  Ninón Sevilla, and Cuando levanta la niebla, with Columba Dominguez and Arturo de Córdova. In 1950, he made his only film in Hollywood The Torch, a remake of Enamorada starring Paulette Goddard.

By the mid-1950s, the films of Fernández became less popular and he was supplanted by other notable Mexican film directors like Luis Buñuel. Fernández returned to his role as actor. Although he did little directing in  the 1960s,  he had several roles as an actor, appearing in: The Soldiers of Pancho Villa (1959), La bandida (1962); The Night of the Iguana (1964, directed by John Huston, where he shared credits with Richard Burton and Ava Gardner); Return of the Seven (1966); The Appaloosa (1966, with Marlon Brando), among many others. His 1967 film A Faithful Soldier of Pancho Villa was entered into the 5th Moscow International Film Festival. He also acted in three films directed by Sam Peckinpah: The Wild Bunch (1969), Pat Garrett and Billy the Kid (1973), and Bring Me the Head of Alfredo Garcia (1974).

During the last years of his life, he did not direct, although he continued to act. In the late 1970s he was imprisoned in Torreón after he was found guilty of the death of a farmer. He was released after 6 months probation.
Missing weekly sign-ins, due to an accident, caused him to be imprisoned again. After finishing his prison sentence, he returned to his house in Coyoacan.

Death 
In early 1986, Emilio Fernández suffered a fall at his home in Acapulco, which caused a fracture of the femur. According to his daughter Adela, in the hospital he received a blood transfusion that was infected with malaria. Emilio Fernández died on 6 August 1986.

Legacy
Fernández's death left a void in the history of Mexican cinema. In addition to his 129 films, he is also seen as bequeathing Mexican culture to the world through  images of Mexicans and evocations of an orderly Mexican society that loved the world.
His film legacy has been recognized with the Ariel Award, the Colón de Oro in Huelva, Spain, and with a chair in his name at the Moscow Film School. Emilio Fernández Romo was known for creating visceral characters, for the drama of his stories, for the use of indigenous characters and their issues, and for reproducing authentic Mexican culture in both Mexican and European films  . With photographer Gabriel Figueroa, writer Mauricio Magdaleno, and actors Pedro Armendáriz, Dolores del Río, María Félix and Columba Dominguez, Romo conducted various productions that promoted both national customs and the values associated with the Mexican Revolution.

He was portrayed by Joaquín Cosio in the Mexican biographical film Cantinflas.

Emilio Fernández was Latin America's most recognized and distinguished filmmaker at the end of the 1940s. He would remain Mexico's top filmmaker until the mid-1950s when his abilities began to wane and he was succeeded by Spanish director Luis Bunuel. Mexican cinema began to collapse commercially as the most famous directors and performers aged or died, and the Golden Age of Mexican movies came to an end.

Fernández directed 43 films between 1942 and 1979. Starting with Cielito Lindo, he was recognized as a screenwriter on 40 films (1936). He also worked as a second unit director on American films made in Mexico, including The Magnificent Seven (1960), when he was sent to the American crew by the Mexican film industry to guarantee that images of Mexicans were neither racist nor insulting.

La Perla was added to the National Film Registry of the United States Library of Congress by the National Film Preservation Board in 2002.

On the 100th anniversary of El Indio's birth, Emilio Fernández and his colleague Gabriel Figueroa were recognized during the inaugural Puerto Vallarta Film Festival of the Americas, held in Puerto Vallarta, Mexico in November 2004.

Personal life
Gladys Fernández, a 16-year-old Cuban girl, became his first wife in 1941. Their relationship was affected by Emilio's passion for Hollywood diva Dolores del Río and Gladys ended up leaving him. Emilio and Gladys had a daughter, the writer Adela Fernández y Fernández.

His most stable relationship was with the actress Columba Domínguez. They were together for seven years, but the relationship collapsed because Columba became pregnant, and he did not want more children. She decided to have the baby without his consent, they broke up. Their daughter, Jacaranda, died in 1978 after falling from the top of a building.

His marriage to Gloria De Valois Cabiedes produced another daughter, Xochitl Fernández De Valois.

Fernández was infatuated with the British-American actress Olivia de Havilland, whom he never met. Fernández asked the then-president of Mexico, Miguel Alemán, to extend a street in Coyoacán to his mansion, and to name it . Thus, he  would always have her symbolically near, transformed into a street, and always at his feet.

After the death of Fernández, a lawsuit broke out between his daughter Adela and Columba Domínguez. Adela had been named sole heir of her father and took possession of his house, a fortress in the neighborhood of Coyoacán in Mexico City, which Columba claimed as her own. According to Columba, Adela was not a biological daughter of Fernández, but was adopted by him when she was abandoned by her mother. Adela's death in 2013 left the legal situation unclear.

The House-Fortress of Fernández, managed by his daughter Adela until her death in 2013, became a space dedicated to various cultural activities in Mexico City, and has served as a backdrop for filming over one hundred Mexican and foreign films.

Filmography

As director

As actor

1928: El destino
1930: Oklahoma Cyclone – Pancho Gomez (uncredited)
1930: The Land of Missing Men – Lopez – aka Black Coyote
1930: Headin' North – Mexican Gambler (uncredited)
1931: Sunrise Trail – Pancho (uncredited)
1932: The Western Code – Indian Joe
1933: Laughing at Life – Revolutionary (uncredited)
1933: Flying Down to Rio – Dancer (uncredited)
1934: La buenaventura – Boris
1934: Corazón bandolero – Chacal
1934: Cruz Diablo – Toparca, bandolero
1935: Martín Garatuza
1935: Tribu  – Itzul
1935: Janitzio – Zirahuén
1936: Celos – Sebastián
1936: María Elena – Bailarín de La Bamba
1936: Marihuana (El monstruo verde) – El Indio
1936: Allá en el Rancho Grande – Dancer
1937: El superloco – Idúa
1937: El impostor
1937: Las cuatro milpas
1937: Las mujeres mandan – Bailarín
1937: Almas rebeldes
1937: Adiós Nicanor – Nicanor
1939: Juan sin miedo – Valentin
1939: With Villa's Veterans – Mayor El Indio Fernández
1940: El fanfarrón: ¡Aquí llegó el valentón! – Aguilucho (Juan José)
1940: Los de Abajo – Pancracio
1940: El charro Negro – Emilio Gómez
1941: El Zorro de Jalisco – Ernesto
1941: Rancho Alegre
1942: La isla de la pasión
1943: Wild Flower – Rogelio Torres
1959: The Soldiers of Pancho Villa – Coronel Antonio Zeta
1962: Pueblito – Coronel (uncredited)
1963: La bandida – Epigmenio Gómez
1963: Paloma herida – Danilo Zata
1964: El revólver sangriento – Félix Gómez
1964: The Night of the Iguana – Barkeeper (uncredited)
1964: Yo, el valiente
1964: Los hermanos Muerte – Marcos Zermeño
1965: The Reward – Sgt. Lopez
1965: La conquista de El Dorado
1965: Un callejón sin salida – Moran
1966: La recta final – Don Lucio
1966: Duelo de pistoleros – Pancho Romero
1966: The Appaloosa – Lazaro
1966: Los malvados – El coyote
1966: Return of the Seven – Francisco Lorca
1967: A Covenant with Death – Igancio
1967: Un tipo dificil de matar
1967: The War Wagon – Calita
1967: A Faithful Soldier of Pancho Villa – Aurelio Pérez
1967: El silencioso – Emilio Segura
1968: Guns for San Sebastian
1968: El caudillo – Coronel
1968: Un toro me llama
1969: The Wild Bunch – General Mapache
1969: Duelo en El Dorado – Indio Romo
1969: El crepúsculo de un Dios – Himself
1970: The Phantom Gunslinger – Sheriff
1971: La chamuscada (Tierra y libertad) – Coronel Margarito Herrero
1971: La sangre enemiga – Juan
1972: Indio – Victorio
1972: El rincón de las vírgenes – Anacleto Morones
1973: Pat Garrett and Billy the Kid – Paco
1974: Bring Me the Head of Alfredo Garcia – El Jefe
1974: Breakout – J.V.
1975: Lucky Lady – Ybarra
1975: Detras de esa puerta – Police Director
1976: Zona roja
1979: Erótica – Hernández
1980: Las cabareteras
1982: Una gallina muy ponedora
1983: Mercenarios de la Muerte – Maestro tata
1984: Under the Volcano – Diosdado
1985: Treasure of the Amazon – Tacho / Paco
1985: Lola la trailera – Leoncio's Bodyguard
1986: Los Amantes del Señor de la Noche – Don Venustiano
1986: The Kidnapping of Lola – Commander Prieto
1986: Ahora mis pistolas hablan
1987: Arriba Michoacán (final film role)

References

Sources

External links

 Biography at the Cinema of Mexico site of the ITESM 
 
 Biopic at IMDB

1904 births
1986 deaths
Best Director Ariel Award winners
Golden Age of Mexican cinema
Mexican male film actors
Mexican male television actors
Mexican film directors
Male actors from Coahuila
20th-century Mexican male actors
Indigenous Mexicans
Kickapoo people
Directors of Palme d'Or winners
Accidental deaths from falls
20th-century Mexican screenwriters
20th-century Mexican male writers
20th-century Native Americans